Jack Binion is an American businessman.  Binion is the son of casino magnate Benny Binion and worked for his father at Binion's Horseshoe, a casino and hotel in Las Vegas, Nevada.

Biography 

Binion became president of the Horseshoe in 1963 at the age of 26. His stature within the organization grew following the Horseshoe Casino's 1970 hosting of the first World Series of Poker, which would become the largest poker tournament in the world. Privately held, Binion's Horseshoe was one of Nevada's most successful casino operations.

In 1998, following a protracted legal battle for control of the Horseshoe among Benny Binion's heirs, Binion sold his interest in Binion's Horseshoe to his sister, Becky Behnen, while retaining a token 1% interest in the operation so that he could lawfully retain his Nevada Gaming License.  He also acquired the rights to the Horseshoe brand outside of Nevada.

Binion went on to form Horseshoe Gaming Holding Corporation which developed and operated several riverboat casinos under the Horseshoe name. Binion continued to promote the casinos for Harrah's Entertainment following his sale of the company in 2004 to Harrah's. As of 2008, Binion's name appears on the "Jack Binion's Steakhouse" at Horseshoe Tunica and Horseshoe Hammond and several of the Horseshoe-branded casinos still carry slot machines bearing Binion's likeness called "Who Wants To Be A Binionaire?" that originated before the Harrah's acquisition.

While running Horseshoe Gaming, Binion started the World Poker Open which at one time was a major feeder tournament for the World Series of Poker.

Binion was inducted into the American Gaming Association's Gaming Hall of Fame on June 11, 2004.  The following year on July 6, 2005, the World Series of Poker, inducted him into the Poker Hall of Fame.

In July 2006, Binion became chairman of Wynn Resorts.  His responsibilities included opening the Wynn Macau. He has since resigned the position but has remained with Wynn Resorts in a consulting role.

References

Sources 
Las Vegas Sun

American casino industry businesspeople
American chief executives of travel and tourism industry companies
American poker players
Living people
World Series of Poker
Poker Hall of Fame inductees
Year of birth missing (living people)